Leonardo Senatore (born May 13, 1984 in Rosario) is an Argentine rugby union player. He plays as a number eight or flanker. He made his debut against Uruguay. He was then selected to play against Chile and scored a try in that game.

In July 2011 rumors reported that RFU Championship side Newcastle Falcons coach Alan Tait had thought of Senatore as a possible signing for the club.

In January 2013 he played for the Aviva Premiership club Worcester Warriors for the 2013–14 season.

He participated at the 2011 Rugby World Cup and 2015 Rugby World Cup.

Senatore is part of the national squad that competes in the Rugby Championship.

See also
Argentina Rugby Union

References

External links
UAR profile
scrum.com profile
itsrugby.co.uk profile

1984 births
People from Rosario, Santa Fe
Argentine rugby union players
Living people
Argentine people of Italian descent
Argentina international rugby union players
Jaguares (Super Rugby) players
Pampas XV players
RC Toulonnais players
Worcester Warriors players
Sportspeople from Rosario, Santa Fe
Rugby union number eights
Male rugby sevens players
Argentine expatriate rugby union players
Argentine expatriate sportspeople in France
Argentine expatriate sportspeople in England
Expatriate rugby union players in France
Expatriate rugby union players in England
Argentina international rugby sevens players